Mazzaella may refer to:
 Mazzaella (alga), a genus of algae in the family Gigartinaceae
 Mazzaella (conodont), an extinct genus of ozarkodinid conodonts in the family Gondolellidae